Pokémon Pocket Monsters, known in Japan and South Korea as simply , is one of the first Pokémon manga to come out in Japan and ran for 13 volumes. In Singapore it was published by Chuang Yi in English in 2005 and it was retitled Pokémon Pocket Monsters. While the first series is set in Kanto, and then Johto, new series were released based on Hoenn, Sinnoh, Unova, Kalos and Alola. The author is Kosaku Anakubo.

On October 11, 2019, it was announced that Pocket Monsters manga would end its regular publication in Bessatsu CoroCoro after 23 years, being replaced by Machito Gomi’s manga-adaptation of the then-current series of the Pokémon television series. Though, Kosaku Anakubo continues to write and illustrate new, shorter chapters, first for the quarterly CoroCoro Aniki (discontinued in early 2021) and then for CoroCoro Online under the moniker Pocket Monsters Aniki.

Plot
The manga follows Red, a young boy competing with a rival, Green, to complete the Illustrated Pokémon Encyclopedia/Pokédex and become the master of Pokémon. In this manga, Pokémon are capable of human speech. It is thought that a Pippi/Clefairy is the main character, although it is just a follower of Red. It is obnoxious but lovable, whose big mouth sometimes gets it into trouble. Surprisingly enough, it comes up with clever ideas to help Red and Pikachu.

In the first few manga books, Red's team consists of Pikachu and Pippi/Clefairy only. However, later on, Red gains a valuable companion in Tyrogue, as well. Pikachu himself is unable to talk.

The story also goes to the Johto region, where Red gets introduced to trainers Gold and Silver, supposedly based on the video game characters. The story then goes to Hoenn in the last volume, where Red thinks of receiving a Achamo/Torchic and abandoning Pippi/Clefairy. It is after this that the story continues under the name of Pokémon Ruby-Sapphire, starting the volume number from 1.

Characters
: Charged with completing the Pokémon Zukan, he is Green's rival.
Clefairy (Pippi in the Japanese version): Red's first Pokémon ally. It is very vulgar and likes to do 'sick' things to attract attention.
Pikachu: Clefairy's younger cousin who joins Red and Clefairy. He is unable to talk.
: Red's rival.

Sequels

Pocket Monsters Ruby-Sapphire

 is the first sequel, and is set in Hoenn. The first volume was released September 25, 2003, and the last was released May 26, 2006. It was released in Singapore by Chuang Yi as Pokémon Pocket Monsters Ruby-Sapphire.

Pocket Monsters Diamond-Pearl
 is the second sequel, and is set in Sinnoh. The first volume was released January 26, 2007, and the last was released October 28, 2009.

Pocket Monsters HGSS
 is the third sequel, and is set in Johto. The first volume was released June 28, 2010, and the second and last was released January 28, 2011. It was released in Singapore as Pokémon Pocket Monsters HGSS.

Pocket Monsters Black-White
 is the fourth sequel, and is set in Unova. It was first released March 6, 2011 and the last volume was released August 28, 2013.

Pocket Monsters XY
 is the fifth sequel, and is set in Kalos. It was first released on April 28, 2014 and the last volume was released on October 28, 2016.

Pocket Monsters Sun and Moon
 is the sixth sequel, and is in Alola. It was first released on November 28, 2017.

Pocket Monsters Sword and Shield
 is the seventh sequel. It was first released on June 11, 2021. It includes the special .

References

External links

Dogasu's Backpack
Bulbapedia entry
Pocket Monsters on the Chuang Yi website (archived)

Children's manga
1996 manga
Nintendo franchises
Pokémon manga
Shogakukan franchises
Shogakukan manga
Seinen manga